Léna Mahfouf (born 19 November 1997), also known by her YouTube name Léna Situations, is a French social media personality and author. In 2021, Forbes France ranked her in their annual 30 Under 30 list in the Cinema & Entertainment category.

Life and career 
Mahfouf was born on 19 November 1997 in Asnières-sur-Seine to two parents from Algeria. In 2013, she joined social networks such as Instagram and Twitter, but it was from 2017 that she opened her YouTube channel, where she gained significant notoriety. She also has a large following on Instagram and TikTok.

Her content focuses on her life moments through vlogs, fashion and lifestyle videos, which makes her, according to Les Inrockuptibles, a rising YouTube star who is changing the face of Internet entertainment. With Bilal Hassani, Sundy Jules and Sulivan Gwed, she forms a group of videographers and influencers who regularly collaborate in their respective vlogs.

On 24 September 2020, Mahfouf published a personal development book titled Toujours plus. With more than 60,000 copies sold in less than a month after its release, it became the #1 bestseller in France in October 2020. The following month, sales exceeded 200 000 copies. By August 2021, the book had exceeded 370,000 copies sold.

In May 2022, she was invited to the prestigious Met Gala ceremony and became the first French influencer to attend. She also attended that year's Cannes Film Festival.

References 

1997 births
Living people
French people of Algerian descent
YouTube vloggers
Social media influencers
21st-century French women writers
Fashion YouTubers